The South Africa Sevens is played annually as part of the IRB Sevens World Series for international rugby sevens. The 2009 competition took place on 11 December and 12 December at Outeniqua Park in George, Western Cape, the second of eight Cup events at the 2009–10 IRB Sevens World Series.  
New Zealand won its second consecutive title by defeating Fiji in the final.

Format
The tournament consists of four round-robin pools of four teams. All sixteen teams progress to the knockout stage. The top two teams from each group progress to quarter-finals in the main competition, with the winners of those quarter-finals competing in cup semi-finals and the losers competing in plate semi-finals. The bottom two teams from each group progress to quarter-finals in the consolation competition, with the winners of those quarter-finals competing in bowl semi-finals and the losers competing in shield semi-finals.

Teams

Pool stages

Pool A
{| class="wikitable" style="text-align: center;"
|-
!width="200"|Team
!width="40"|Pld
!width="40"|W
!width="40"|D
!width="40"|L
!width="40"|PF
!width="40"|PA
!width="40"|+/-
!width="40"|Pts
|- 
|align=left| 
|3||2||1||0||95||19||76||8
|-
|align=left| 
|3||2||1||0||79||31||48||8
|-
|align=left| 
|3||1||0||2||36||84||-48||5
|- 
|align=left| 
|3||0||0||3||26||102||-76||3
|}

Pool B
{| class="wikitable" style="text-align: center;"
|-
!width="200"|Team
!width="40"|Pld
!width="40"|W
!width="40"|D
!width="40"|L
!width="40"|PF
!width="40"|PA
!width="40"|+/-
!width="40"|Pts
|- 
|align=left| 
|3||3||0||0||112||19||93||9
|- 
|align=left| 
|3||1||1||1||35||50||-15||6
|-
|align=left| 
|3||1||0||2||33||83||-50||5
|-
|align=left| 
|3||0||1||2||38||66||-28||4
|}

Pool C
{| class="wikitable" style="text-align: center;"
|-
!width="200"|Team
!width="40"|Pld
!width="40"|W
!width="40"|D
!width="40"|L
!width="40"|PF
!width="40"|PA
!width="40"|+/-
!width="40"|Pts
|-
|align=left| 
|3||3||0||0||60||29||31||9
|- 
|align=left| 
|3||2||0||1||96||34||62||7
|- 
|align=left| 
|3||1||0||2||25||55||-30||5
|-
|align=left| 
|3||0||0||3||19||82||-63||3
|}

Pool D
{| class="wikitable" style="text-align: center;"
|-
!width="200"|Team
!width="40"|Pld
!width="40"|W
!width="40"|D
!width="40"|L
!width="40"|PF
!width="40"|PA
!width="40"|+/-
!width="40"|Pts
|- 
|align=left| 
|3||3||0||0||91||26||65||9
|-
|align=left| 
|3||2||0||1||65||22||43||7
|- 
|align=left| 
|3||1||0||2||50||58||-8||5
|-
|align=left| 
|3||0||0||3||14||114||-100||3
|}

Knockout

Shield

Bowl

Plate

Cup

Statistics

Individual points

Individual tries

External links 
 
 IRB Sevens
 South Africa 7s on irb.com

South Africa
South Africa Sevens
Sevens